Ajantha Wijesinghe Perera is a Sri Lankan academic, scientist, university lecturer, environmental activist and politician. She is known for her efforts to end the garbage crisis in Sri Lanka and is nicknamed as Garbage Queen. She founded the National Programme on Recycling of Solid Waste to solve the garbage crisis.

Early life and education 
Ajantha Perera completed her higher studies in England and returned to Sri Lanka at the age of 23. She joined the University of Kelaniya as an assistant lecturer in Biochemistry, Physiology and Zoology. She joined the University of Colombo as a senior lecturer in Environmental Studies where she also completed her graduation.

Career 
Perera has worked as an expert with several ministries in Sri Lanka and in Fiji. She is currently working to make a recycling management strategy for solid waste in the country. She took interest in politics in 2019 and contested for the Socialist Party of Sri Lanka at the 2019 Presidential Elections and received 27,572 votes claiming seventh spot among the candidates. 

She became the first female Presidential candidate to contest at the elections after 20 years.

In February 2020, she joined the UNP party following an invitation suggested by the UNP leader Ranil Wickremesinghe and insisted that her grandfather had also originally represented the party. She also contested at the 2020 Sri Lankan parliamentary election representing the United National Party from the Colombo district.

References 

1963 births
Candidates in the 2019 Sri Lankan presidential election
Living people
Sri Lankan educators
Sri Lankan women academics
Sri Lankan women activists
Sri Lankan women scientists
Sri Lankan women environmentalists

United National Party politicians
Sri Lankan environmentalists